Xylota puella is a species of hoverfly in the family Syrphidae.

Distribution
Madeira.

References

Eristalinae
Insects described in 1921
Taxa named by Theodor Becker
Diptera of Africa